The Oerlikon-Bührle  8 cm Flz.-Rakete Oerlikon (8 cm aircraft roket) is an 80-mm rocket produced in Switzerland by Oerlikon-Buehrle. Developed from 1947 to 1952  and used until 1991 by the Swiss Air Force under the name Oe85.

Overview

The rocket consists essentially of three parts:
 The drive unit with the solid rocket fuel inside and four tail fins and two mounting devices with which the rocket is attached to the weapon carrier.
 The warhead, Optional is a high-explosive fragmentation and hollow-charge or for training an inert warhead.
 The impact fuze.
From the rocket exists also a "Manipulier" (training / inert)version, they have no explosives and no rocket propellant, however, are identical to the real projectile in the shape, aerodynamic and weight.
It was used on the de Havilland Venom and Hawker Hunter fighters. The use in the FFA P-16 was planned, but it was only used for trials and testing of the P-16 prototypes because these aircraft never went into serial production. 
For the projectiles, there were three different weapons carrier / Pylons:
 Pylon for a single rocket
 Pylon for two rockets in tandem
 Pylon for four missiles on each pylon side in tandem

External Pictures
 On aircraft fitted with 2 and 4 pylon
various images of the rocket

References

https://web.archive.org/web/20140808061757/http://www.lw.admin.ch/internet/luftwaffe/de/home/themen/history/mittelaus/hunter/bewaffnung.html
https://www.swiss-archives.ch/detail.aspx?ID=7171229
Tidsskrift i sjöväsendet. Nr.7 1953.

Rheinmetall
Air-to-ground rockets
Artillery of Switzerland
Oerlikon-Contraves
Rocket artillery
Military equipment introduced in the 1950s